The State Bank of Kamiah is a building located in Kamiah, Idaho, United States, listed on the National Register of Historic Places.

It was designed by architect Ralph Loring and was built by masons Fred Dole and Jesse Collins.

See also

 List of National Historic Landmarks in Idaho
 National Register of Historic Places listings in Lewis County, Idaho

References

1919 establishments in Idaho
Bank buildings on the National Register of Historic Places in Idaho
Buildings and structures in Lewis County, Idaho
Chicago school architecture in the United States
Commercial buildings completed in 1919
Commercial Style architecture in the United States
National Register of Historic Places in Lewis County, Idaho